Long Dole Wood and Meadows SSSI is a  biological Site of Special Scientific Interest (SSSI) between the villages of Farrington Gurney and Hinton Blewitt in Bath and North East Somerset, notified in 1987.

The site was previously called Holly Marsh. The meadows are summer grazed, with a heath grass and sedge environment with orchids.

The site is situated on the flood plain of a valley formed by a tributary of the Cam Brook and support two neutral grassland communities with a restricted British distribution. Two ancient woodland sites are also present with ash, oak, hazel, wych elm and other tree varieties which show evidence of coppicing. The ground flora includes Solomon's seal (Polygonatum multiflorum).

When the site was recorded as an SSSI it supported a strong breeding population of the marsh fritillary (Eurodryas aurinia), however this declined in the late 20th century, and this species is no longer found at the site.

References

Sites of Special Scientific Interest in Avon
Sites of Special Scientific Interest notified in 1987
Bath and North East Somerset
Meadows in Somerset
Woodland Sites of Special Scientific Interest
Forests and woodlands of Somerset